Arabella Station is a pastoral lease that currently operates as a cattle station in Queensland.

The property was established at some time prior to 1887 and in 1888 was owned by Mr McKenzie and was trading in cattle.

In 1907 Messrs Fisken and Bunning sold the property to Arnold Wienholt. The  property was stocked with 2,000 cattle and 30 horses.

Messrs Keogh and Rowe sold the unstocked  property in 1924 to C. E. Tidswell.

In 1938 Tidswell sold the  property for £20,000 to G. H. Griffiths. It was stocked with 10,000 sheep at this time.

In 1956 the homestead was the scene of an armed robbery when a man crashed his stolen car nearby then menaced the owner, C. Starky, with a shotgun before stealing one of the station trucks.

In 2014 the  property was in the grip of drought. The owner, Greg Ballinger, had been destocking cattle since early 2013 and had used thinning permits to feed stock mulga along with supplements to keep the herd alive.

See also
List of ranches and stations

References

Stations (Australian agriculture)
Pastoral leases in Queensland
South West Queensland